Davor Božinović (born 27 December 1961) is a Croatian diplomat and politician who serves as Minister of the Interior and Deputy Prime Minister of Croatia since 2017. He previously served as Minister of Defence from 2010 to 2011.

In 1987, Božinović joined Socialist Croatia's Ministry of Defence.

He served as an Ambassador of Croatia to Serbia and Montenegro from 2002 to 2004. In 2004, he was appointed as Head of the Office of the President of Croatia Stjepan Mesić. From 2005 to 2008, he served as Head of Mission of the Republic of Croatia to NATO. In September 2008, he was appointed State Secretary for European integration at the Ministry of Foreign Affairs and European Integration (MVPEI), and in July 2009 as State Secretary for Political Affairs at the same ministry.

See also 
 Cabinet of Andrej Plenković I
 Cabinet of Andrej Plenković II

External links

Davor Božinović at the Government of Croatia official website

1961 births
Living people
People from Pula
Croatian people of Montenegrin descent
Faculty of Political Sciences, University of Zagreb alumni
Defence ministers of Croatia
Ambassadors of Croatia to Serbia
Ambassadors of Croatia to Montenegro
Permanent Representatives of Croatia to NATO
Interior ministers of Croatia